Robert Larsen (1931–2019) was an American football coach and college athletics administrator. Robert Larson may also refer to:

Robert Larsen (boxer) (1898–1981), Danish boxer
Robert "Bud" Larsen (born 1942), American fiddle maker

See also
Robert Larson (disambiguation)